The Megalakkos (Spelaio Megalokkos) is a rock shelter located north of the village of Kleidonia in the Ioannina regional unit and around  east of the Kleidi Cave, northwestern Greece. It sits atop the northern bank of the Voidomatis river valley.

Archaeology

Analogous discoveries were made by the same research team in the neighboring Kleidi cave.

References

Caves of Greece
Landforms of Ioannina (regional unit)
Prehistoric Greece
Landforms of Epirus (region)